Hannersdorf is a municipality in Burgenland in the district of Oberwart in Austria.

Geography
Parts of the municipality are Hannersdorf, Burg, and Woppendorf.

Population

Politics
Of the 15 positions on the municipal council, the SPÖ has 8, and the ÖVP 7.

References

External links 
 Pictures of Hannersdorf

Cities and towns in Oberwart District